The Woman in White is a five-part BBC television adaptation of the 1860 sensation novel of the same name by Wilkie Collins. The series began airing on BBC One on 22 April 2018, and stars Jessie Buckley, Ben Hardy, Olivia Vinall, Dougray Scott and Charles Dance.

Plot summary

Cast and characters
 Jessie Buckley as Marian Halcombe
 Ben Hardy as Walter Hartright
 Olivia Vinall as Laura Fairlie/Anne Catherick
 Dougray Scott as Sir Percival Glyde
 Riccardo Scamarcio as Count Fosco
 Charles Dance as Frederick Fairlie
 Art Malik as Erasmus Nash
 Joanna Scanlan as Mrs Vesey
 Vicki Pepperdine as Mrs Michelson
 Kerry Fox as Mrs Catherick
 Nicholas Jones as Mr Gilmore
 Ivan Kaye as Professor Pesca
 Sonya Cassidy as Madam Fosco
 Cathy Belton as Mrs Hartright
 Tony Flynn as Mr Merriman, Percival Glyde's solicitor

Episodes

Production
Filming for the series began in February 2017 in Belfast, Northern Ireland.

Differences from the novel
The script condensed the original novel. In the television production, the character Erasmus Nash (played by Art Malik) was added to achieve some of that condensation. In the book, Walter does all of Nash's detective activities.

References

External links
 
 

2018 British television series debuts
2018 British television series endings
2010s British drama television series
BBC television dramas
2010s British television miniseries
English-language television shows
Television shows based on British novels